MareNostrum is the main supercomputer in the Barcelona Supercomputing Center. It is the most powerful supercomputer in Spain, one of thirteen supercomputers in the Spanish Supercomputing Network and one of the seven supercomputers of the European infrastructure PRACE (Partnership for Advanced Computing in Europe).

MareNostrum runs SUSE Linux 11 SP3. It occupies 180 m² (less than half a basketball court).

The supercomputer is used in human genome research, protein research, astrophysical simulations, weather forecasting, geological or geophysical modeling, and the design of new drugs. It was booted up for the first time on 12 April 2005, and is available to the national and international scientific community.

Mare Nostrum ("our sea") was the Roman name for the Mediterranean Sea. The supercomputer is housed in the deconsecrated Chapel Torre Girona at the Polytechnic University of Catalonia, Barcelona, Spain.

MareNostrum 4

MareNostrum 4 has been dubbed the most diverse and likely the most interesting supercomputer in the world thanks to the heterogeneity of the architecture it will include once the installation of the supercomputer is complete. Its total speed will be 13.7 petaflops. It has five storage racks with the capacity to store 14 petabytes (14 million gigabytes) of data. A high-speed Omnipath network connects all the components in the supercomputer to one another.

MareNostrum 4 is built inside of the Torre Girona chapel.

The supercomputer includes two separate parts: a general-purpose block and a block featuring emerging technologies.

The general-purpose block has 48 racks with 3,456 Lenovo ThinkSystem SD530 compute nodes. Each node has two Intel Xeon Platinum chips, each with 24 processors, amounting to a total of 165,888 processors and main memory of 390  terabytes. Its peak performance is 11.15  petaflops. While its performance is 10 times greater than its predecessor, MareNostrum 3, its power will only increase by 30% to 1.3 MW.

The block of emerging technologies is formed of clusters of three different technologies, which will be incorporated and updated as they become available on the market. These technologies are currently being developed in the United States and Japan to speed up the arrival of the new generation of pre-exascale supercomputers. They are as follows:

 Cluster comprising IBM POWER9 and NVIDIA Volta GPUs, with a computational capacity of over 1.5  petaflops. IBM and NVIDIA will use these processors for the Summit and Sierra supercomputers that the US Department of Energy has ordered for its Oak Ridge and Lawrence Livermore National Laboratories.
 Cluster made up of AMD Rome processors and AMD Radeon Instinct MI50. The machine will have a similar processor and accelerator than the Frontier supercomputer that will be installed in 2021 at ORNL. The computing power of the machine will be 0.52 Petaflop/s.
 Cluster formed of 64-bit ARMv8 processors in a prototype machine, using state-of-the-art technologies from the Japanese Post-K supercomputer. Computing power over 0.65 Petaflop/s.

The aim of gradually incorporating these emerging technologies into MareNostrum 4 is to allow BSC to experiment with what are expected to be the most advanced technological developments over the next few years and evaluate their suitability for future iterations of MareNostrum.

MareNostrum 4 has a disk storage capacity of 14  petabytes and is connected to BSC’s big data facilities, which have a total capacity of 24.6  petabytes. Like its predecessors, MareNostrum 4 will also be connected to European research centres and European universities via the RedIRIS and GÉANT networks.

MareNostrum 3

The previous version, MareNostrum 3, consisted of 3,056 IBM iDataPlex DX360M4 compute nodes, for a total of 48,896 physical Intel Sandy Bridge cores running at 2.6 GHz, and 84 Xeon Phi 5110P in 42 nodes. MareNostrum 3 had 36 racks dedicated to calculations. In total, each rack had 1,344 cores and 2,688 GB of memory. Each IBM iDataPlex Compute rack was composed of 84 IBM iDataPlex dx360 M4 compute nodes and four Mellanox 36-port Managed FDR10 IB Switches. dx360 M4 compute nodes were grouped into a 2U Chassis, having two columns of 42 2U chassis.

The computing nodes of MareNostrum 3 communicated primarily through a high bandwidth, low latency InfiniBand FDR10 network. The different nodes were interconnected via fibre optic cables and Mellanox 648-port FDR10 Infiniband Core Switches. In addition, there was a more traditional local area network consisting of Gigabit Ethernet adapters.

MareNostrum 2
These older version has been based on a 2,560 IBM BladeCenter JS21 nodes with PowerPC 970MP processors and with 20 TB system memory.

Image gallery

See also 
 LINPACK TOP500

References

External links 

 Barcelona Supercomputing Center
 Top 500 supercomputers
 IBM's MareNostrum page
 Slashdot: Building The MareNostrum COTS Supercomputer
 MoDEL Database
 MareNostrum IV User's guide

IBM supercomputers
Lenovo supercomputers
Spanish Supercomputing Network
IDataPlex supercomputers